William Barta (born January 4, 1996) is an American professional road racing cyclist, who currently rides for UCI WorldTeam .

Career
He was the second youngest rider in the 2016 Tour of California. In August 2019, he was named in the startlist for the 2019 Vuelta a España, his first Grand Tour. He also rode the race in 2020, finishing 22nd overall. He recorded a second-place finish on stage 13, an individual time trial; he had held the best time until Primož Roglič, the penultimate rider to start, bettered his time by one second.

Major results

2013
 5th Overall Tour de l'Abitibi
1st Young rider classification
1st Stage 3 (ITT)
2014
 2nd Time trial, National Junior Road Championships
 3rd Overall Course de la Paix Juniors
 3rd Overall Tour du Pays de Vaud
1st Stage 1
 4th Overall Tour de l'Abitibi
 6th Overall Trofeo Karlsberg
1st Points classification
1st Stage 2a
2015
 8th Overall Tour de Bretagne
2016
 7th Trofeo Banca Popolare di Vicenza
2017
 2nd Time trial, National Under-23 Road Championships
 4th Time trial, National Road Championships
 4th Liège–Bastogne–Liège U23
 9th Overall Le Triptyque des Monts et Châteaux
 9th Overall Flèche du Sud
 10th Overall Tour de Bretagne
2018
 3rd Overall Le Triptyque des Monts et Châteaux
 5th Overall Redlands Bicycle Classic
2021
 5th Time trial, National Road Championships
2023
 5th Overall O Gran Camiño
 8th Overall Saudi Tour

Grand Tour general classification results timeline

References

External links

1996 births
Living people
American male cyclists
Sportspeople from Boise, Idaho
Cyclists from Idaho